Birla College of Arts, Science & Commerce, established in 1972, is an affiliate of the University of Mumbai in India. It is accredited by National Assessment and Accreditation Council and awarded an 'A' Grade. It is a multi-faculty institution of higher education with an enrolment of more than 11,900 students. The institution is now known as B.K. Birla College of Arts, Science & Commerce.

Academics
Birla College offers several undergraduate programmes in arts, science and commerce and postgraduate programmes in botany, biotechnology, bioanalytical sciences, environmental sciences, chemistry, herbal science, computer science, information technology, artificial intelligence, data science and data analytics, finance, physics, microbiology, zoology, Hindi, Marathi, commerce and e-commerce and Ph.D. in botany, biotechnology, physics, microbiology, chemistry - nanotechnology and Hindi. The college conducts three-year Bachelor of Management Studies (B.M.S.), Bachelor of Science (Information Technology), Bachelor of Mass Media (B.M.M.), and Bachelor in Financial management ( B.F.Mg ) programmes. It has taken initiative to introduce relevant interdisciplinary need-based career-oriented 'add-on' courses. The college also conducts a PGDMLT programme.

The college conducts BA, BCom, B Lib and MBA programme of Yashwantrao Chavan Maharashtra Open University, Nashik through contact sessions. YCMO University has established the Virtual Learning Centre at Birla College which enables the students to receive lectures through EDUSAT (satellite). The college is also a Centre of Institute of Distance Education of the University of Mumbai.

Facilities
Birla College has infrastructure to meet the requirement of teaching, research and co-curricular activities/extracurricular activities including sports, National Cadet Corps, National Service Scheme, etc.

Achievements
It was accredited by National Assessment and Accreditation Council with a 5-Star status in 2002 and was re-accredited and awarded 'A' Grade with CGPA - 3.37.

Birla College was awarded with "College with Potential for Excellence" status for 2010 by the University Grants Commission, the apex body for Higher Education Under Ministry of Human Resource Development, Government of India.

It was awarded the Best College Award by the University of Mumbai for 2008-2009.

Alumini

Ashish Patil, Bollywood choreographer - He rose from small suburban area called Shahad on the outskirts of Mumbai to make a name for himself in Marathi and Hindi film industry. He is a well-known TV personality as well, having appeared and choreographed on a number of dance shows. He has conducted dancing workshops in a host of countries outside India.

References

Universities and colleges in Maharashtra
Affiliates of the University of Mumbai
Education in Kalyan-Dombivli
Educational institutions established in 1972
1972 establishments in Maharashtra

External links